Mohamed Bouchouari (born 15 November 2000) is a Belgian professional footballer who plays as a right-back for Eredivisie club FC Emmen, on  loan from RSC Anderlecht.

Career
Bouchouari played youth football with Beerschot, Zulte Waregem, PSV Eindhoven and RSC Anderlecht. He played as a winger before adapting to play as a wing-back and then full-back. In June 2019 Bouchouari joined F91 Dudelange. He experienced playing in the UEFA Europa League for the Luxembourg side in the 2019-20 season before it was curtailed by the COVID-19 pandemic. He returned to and Anderlecht in December 2020 and signed a contract until June 2022. In February 2022 he renewed his contract until 2024. Playing for the Anderlecht U23 team in the Belgian First Division B he scored his first professional goal for RSCA Futures against SK Beveren in August 2022.

On transfer deadline day in September 2022 he joined FC Emmen of the Eredivisie on loan. Bouchouari scored his first goal in the Eredivisie as Emmen secured a 3-3 draw with champions AFC Ajax on 12 November, 2022. He was awarded man in the match for his performance in the game, the third time he had received that honour for Emmen in his eighth game.

International career
In 2018 Bouchouari represented Belgium at under-19 level.

Personal life
Bouchouari is of Moroccan heritage.

References

External links

2000 births
Belgian people of Moroccan descent
Living people
Belgian footballers
Belgium youth international footballers
Association football defenders
R.S.C. Anderlecht players
FC Emmen players
Challenger Pro League players
Eredivisie players
Belgian expatriate footballers
Expatriate footballers in the Netherlands
Belgian expatriate sportspeople in the Netherlands